Route 436, also known as L'Anse aux Meadows Road, is a  north-south highway on the Great Northern Peninsula of Newfoundland in the Canadian province of Newfoundland and Labrador.  Its southern terminus is an intersection on Route 430 (Viking Trail/Great Northern Peninsula Highway), and its northern terminus is at L'Anse aux Meadows, a world-famous archaeological site.

Route description

Route 436 begins at an intersection with Route 430 (Great Northern Peninsula Highway/Viking Trail) just a few kilometres northwest of St. Anthony. It heads northeast through rural areas to cross a couple of brooks before having an intersection with Route 437 (Cape Onion Road). The highway now begins winding its way along the coastline as it passes through St. Lunaire-Griquet and Gunners Cove. Route 436 has an intersection with a local road leading to Quirpon before it passes through Noddy Bay and Straitsview (also known as Spillars Cove). The highway now meets a short local road to Hay Cove before entering L'Anse aux Meadows, where it meets a road leading to the visitor center before coming to an end at an intersection with Norstead Road.

Attractions along Route 436

L'Anse aux Meadows National Historic Site

Major intersections

References

436